Fronan is a town in central Ivory Coast. It is a sub-prefecture and commune of Katiola Department in Hambol Region, Vallée du Bandama District.

In 2021, the population of the sub-prefecture of Fronan was 56,796.

Villages
The 8 villages of the sub-prefecture of Fronan and their population in 2014 are:
 Darakokaha (5 966)
 Fronan (16 647)
 Naplékaha (2 751)
 Ouanadiékaha (3 801)
 Tiengala (2 033)
 Kanangonon (4 649)
 Tafolo (2 411)
 Takala (659)

Notes

Sub-prefectures of Hambol
Communes of Hambol